Book of Revelation is the last book of the New Testament in the Bible.

Book of Revelation may also refer to:

 The Book of Revelation (novel), a novel by Rupert Thomson
 The Book of Revelation (film), a 2006 film based on Rupert Thomson's novel
 Yazidi Book of Revelation, a holy book of the Yazidi religion
 Breed II: Book of Revelation, a Breed comics limited series
 Hegelian Dialectic (The Book of Revelation), a 2017 album by Prodigy

See also
 Revelation (disambiguation)